The Bellarmine Knights men's soccer program represents the Bellarmine University in all NCAA Division I men's college soccer competitions. Founded in 1974, the Knights compete in the Atlantic Sun Conference. The Knights are coached by Tim Chastonay, who has coached the program since 1998. The Knights plays their home matches at Owsley B. Frazier Stadium, on the Bellarmine campus.

The Knights began play in NCAA Division I in the 2020 season.

Seasons

Championships

Conference Regular Season Championships

Coaching records

Postseason

NCAA Division II Tournament results 
Bellarmine made one appearance in the NCAA Division II Men's Soccer Tournament. Their record is 0–1–1.

References

External links 
 
 2015 Record Book

 
Association football clubs established in 1974
1974 establishments in Kentucky